96th Street may refer to:
96th Street (Manhattan)
96th Street (IRT Broadway–Seventh Avenue Line)
96th Street (IND Eighth Avenue Line)
96th Street (IRT Lexington Avenue Line)
96th Street (IND Second Avenue Line)
96th Street (Los Angeles Metro)